Tunisia, participated at the 2011 All-Africa Games held in the city of Maputo, Mozambique. She won 68 medals; 29 gold, 26 silver and 13 bronze., and she finished the competition in the 4th position.

Medal summary

Medal table

Medal winners

Boxing

Athletics
In athletics, Tunisia finished the competition in the 6th position with 6 medals; 3 golds and 3 silvers.

Chaima Trabelsi won the gold medal in 20 km walk event, with a new All-Africa Games record in 1:40:35.

Men

Women

Para-sport events

Men

Women

Swimming
With 13 medals; 4 gold, 7 silver and 2 bronze, Tunisia finished the competition in the second rank in swimming which was dominated by South Africa team with 74 medals.
The swimmer Ahmed Mathlouthi won three gold medals in 100m, 200m and 400m freestyle events with two game records.

Men's results

Women's results

Judo
Tunisia was the top ranked in medals table in Judo with 7 medals; 6 gold and one bronze.

Men's results

Women's results

Karate

Men's result

Women's result

Canoeing
In Canoeing, Tunisia finished the competition in the second position below South Africa with 8 medals; 3 golds, 4 silvers and a single bronze medal.

Slalom

Sprint
Men's result

Women's result

References

Nations at the 2011 All-Africa Games
2011
All-Africa Games